Big Creek Township is one of nine townships in Stokes County, North Carolina, United States. The township had a population of 1,984 according to the 2000 census.

Geographically, Big Creek Township occupies  in northwestern Stokes County. The township's western border is with Surry County and the northern border is with the state of Virginia. There are no incorporated municipalities in Big Creek Township but there are several unincorporated communities, including Asbury, Collinstown and Francisco.

Townships in Stokes County, North Carolina
Townships in North Carolina